Damian James Le Bas (born 11 May 1985) is a British writer and journalist from West Sussex in England best known for his book The Stopping Places: A Journey Through Gypsy Britain.

Life
Le Bas is the son of the artists Damian Le Bas and Delaine Le Bas. He grew up in Worthing, attending Christ's Hospital school and then reading Theology at St John's College, Oxford. His work as a journalist has included editorship of Travellers Times.

In 2018 he presented the BBC documentary A Very British History: Romany Gypsies.

In 2019, he was part of a panel discussion on the theme of Identity at the Alpine Fellowship.

Bibliography
In 2018, Le Bas published The Stopping Places: A Journey Through Gypsy Britain, a mixture of memoir, travel writing and an exploration of Romani history in Britain. In June 2018, the book was featured on BBC Radio 4 as book of the week.

Before its publication, The Stopping Places won a 2016 Jerwood Award supporting authors writing their first major commissioned non-fiction work.

References 

1985 births
English male writers
Living people
People from Worthing
21st-century English writers
People educated at Christ's Hospital
Alumni of St John's College, Oxford
English Romani people
Romani writers